Born to Use Mics: Reading Nas's Illmatic, edited by Michael Eric Dyson and Sohail Daulatzai, is a collection of scholarly essays and historical documents presenting Illmatic from an academic perspective. The book features contributions from scholars and intellectuals such as Adilifu Nama, Guthrie P. Ramsey Jr., James Peterson, Marc Lamont Hill, Mark Anthony Neal, Imani Perry, Kyra Gaunt, and Eddie S. Glaude among others. It also includes a preface written by Common. In the introduction, Sohail Daulatzai explains the structure of the book, writing:

 
Born to Use Mics... attempts to establish itself as a guide for exploring Illmatic and its lessons on race, gender, and hip-hop culture. It includes an interpretive chapter for each song on the album, and  features a section devoted to interviews, reviews, and personal reminiscences.  The book has been noted as a milestone in hip-hop scholarship, since it is the first to assemble a group of scholars and intellectuals to analyze a singular album within the genre. In a review of Born to Use Mics, Alessandro Porco comments on the significance of this intellectual project: "Given the high volume of books published every year on hip-hop music and culture, it's surprising that Born to Use Mics is the first book of its kind, one dedicated to a single epoch-defining record."

References

Nas
Hip hop books
2009 non-fiction books